The Venture 21 is an American trailerable sailboat that was designed by Roger MacGregor as a racer-cruiser and first built in 1966.

Boat reviewer Darrell Nicholson noted, "capitalizing on the fiberglass revolution in boatbuilding, MacGregor’s business-school project sparked a pivotal marketing shift that helped bring recreational sailing to mainstream America".

The design was developed into the MacGregor 21 in 1980.

Production
The design was built by MacGregor Yacht Corporation in the United States, from 1966 to 1979, but it is now out of production. It was the first monohull boat produced by the company.

Design
The boat was designed by MacGregor as part of his Stanford University Master of Business Administration degree program, with a prototype built in 1965 and then put into production.

The Venture 21 is a recreational keelboat, built predominantly of fiberglass, with wood trim. Early production boats had a plywood-cored deck, while later ones were balsa-cored. It has a cutter rig, a spooned raked stem, a slightly angled transom, a transom-hung rudder controlled by a tiller and a swing keel. It displaces  and carries  of iron ballast.

The boat is normally fitted with a small  outboard motor for docking and maneuvering.

The design has sleeping accommodation for four people, with a double "V"-berth in the bow cabin and two straight settee berths in the main cabin.

For sailing downwind the design may be equipped with a symmetrical spinnaker.

Operational history
In a 2010 review Steve Henkel wrote, "best features: Price (on the used market, of course, since this design is no longer made) is below her comp[etitor]s, reflecting an ultra-low price when she was new—and perhaps some perceptions of the level of construction quality. Worst features: Headroom is lowest of the group of comp[etitor]s. Motion Index is worst of the group (though all her comp[etitor]s are so low it doesn't make much difference). Her Space Index is also at the bottom of the list. Her cast iron keel, like that on her comp[etitor]s, is a maintenance chore, since it eventually begins to need frequent attention to keep rust at bay. Hardware is not as high quality as her comps."

In a 2011 used boat review in Practical Sailor, Darrell Nicholson wrote, "with two quarter berths and a V-berth, the Venture 21 technically could sleep four, but this sort of arrangement probably would be brief and acrimonious. Although you could pack a lot of gear under the cockpit, actual locker storage is limited. Some ambitious owners have added sinks, small galleys, 12-volt systems, and port-a-potties below, but the boat’s cramped headroom restricts its suitability for more than a few days of cruising. For the 20-something adventurer with aspirations of camp-cruising on one of America’s many inland lakes, it will do just fine, but more than a couple of days aboard a boat this size will be a sure test of any marriage."

See also
List of sailing boat types

Related development
MacGregor 21

References

Keelboats
1960s sailboat type designs
Sailing yachts 
Trailer sailers
Sailboat type designs by Roger MacGregor
Sailboat types built by the MacGregor Yacht Corporation